Sinclair Islet is a small island north of Shelburne Bay in far north Queensland, Australia about 150 km north of Cape Grenville, Cape York Peninsula in the Great Barrier Reef Marine Park Queensland, Australia.

It is about 40 km east from Orford Ness and the Apudthama National Park.

Islands on the Great Barrier Reef